The Bridgehampton Grand Prix was a sports car race held at Bridgehampton Race Circuit between 1961 and 1969.

Results

 In 1964, only GT cars counted towards the World Sportscar Championship; the top GT finisher was Ken Miles in a Shelby Cobra.

See also
Bridgehampton Sports Car Races

World Sportscar Championship races
Can-Am races
Sports car races
Auto races in the United States
Motorsport competitions in New York (state)